Cyphostemmin A is an oligostilbene found in Cyphostemma crotalarioides (Vitaceae).

References

Resveratrol oligomers
Stilbenoid dimers